Daniel Ingalls may refer to:

 Daniel H. H. Ingalls, Sr. (1916–1999), American linguist & academic
 Daniel Henry Holmes Ingalls, Jr. (born 1944), American computer scientist